The 1979 Prince Edward Island general election was held on April 23, 1979.

The election was held just one year after the 1978 election, which featured a 17–15 split in MLAs in the legislature. Following the resignation of former premier Alex Campbell from his seat, the Legislature was in a 15–15 tie in voting members (the Liberal Speaker, Russell Perry, could not cast active votes in his role), the new Premier Bennett Campbell decided to call an election in an effort to regain his lost majority. The gambit failed, and instead the Progressive Conservatives led by Angus MacLean formed a strong majority government.

The campaign was the first to feature a female party leader running in PEI, with Doreen Sark serving as interim leader of the NDP. The campaign was also the only one in which the "Draft Beer Party of PEI" ran, with one candidate in 5th Queens.

Party standings

Members elected

The Legislature of Prince Edward Island had two levels of membership from 1893 to 1996 - Assemblymen and Councillors. This was a holdover from when the Island had a bicameral legislature, the General Assembly and the Legislative Council.

In 1893, the Legislative Council was abolished and had its membership merged with the Assembly, though the two titles remained separate and were elected by different electoral franchises. Assembleymen were elected by all eligible voters of within a district. Before 1963, Councillors were only elected by landowners within a district, but afterward they were elected in the same manner as Assemblymen.

Kings

Prince

Queens

Sources

Further reading
 

1979 elections in Canada
Elections in Prince Edward Island
1979 in Prince Edward Island
April 1979 events in Canada